Norma McCormick (born July 5, 1944 in Dauphin, Manitoba) is a Canadian politician. She was a member of the Legislative Assembly of Manitoba from 1993 to 1995, and a member of the Liberal Party of Manitoba.

She was born Norma Kester, the daughter of Norman McDonald Kester and Margaret Evelyn Strang. Before entering public life, McCormick was a health-care business owner. She is the founder, and from 1987 to 1993, the president of Corporate Health Works, Inc.

Political career
She first ran for the Manitoba legislature in the provincial election of 1977, finishing third in the central-Winnipeg riding of Wolseley. She did not run for office again until 1993, when she was elected for the nearby riding of Osborne, replacing Reg Alcock, who had resigned to run in that year's federal election. McCormick defeated her nearest opponent, New Democrat Irene Haigh, by over 500 votes. Her time in the legislature was brief. In the 1995 provincial election, she lost to NDP candidate Diane McGifford by almost 1,000 votes. She has not sought a return to office since that time.

Electoral record

After her defeat, McCormick returned to the leadership of Corporate Health Works, Inc. She has also taught courses in occupational safety at the University of Manitoba.

She has served as the chair of the Standards Council of Canada's Consumer and Public Interest Committee. In 2009, she was named chairperson of the International Organization for Standardization's Committee on Consumer Policy for 2010–2011.

References

1944 births
Living people
Manitoba Liberal Party MLAs
People from Dauphin, Manitoba
Women MLAs in Manitoba